The 1977–78 Divizia B was the 38th season of the second tier of the Romanian football league system.

The format has been maintained to three series, each of them having 18 teams. At the end of the season the winners of the series promoted to Divizia A and the last four places from each series relegated to Divizia C.

Team changes

To Divizia B
Promoted from Divizia C
 CS Botoșani
 Viitorul Vaslui
 Carpați Sinaia
 Tulcea
 Autobuzul București
 Muscelul Câmpulung
 Pandurii Târgu Jiu
 Minerul Moldova Nouă
 Victoria Carei
 Avântul Reghin
 ICIM Brașov
 Gaz Metan Mediaș

Relegated from Divizia A
 Rapid București
 Progresul București
 FCM Galați

From Divizia B
Relegated to Divizia C
 Unirea Focșani
 Flacăra-Automecanica Moreni
 Sticla Arieșul Turda
 Borzești
 Voința București
 Rapid Arad
 Minerul Gura Humorului
 SN Oltenița
 IS Câmpia Turzii
 Olimpia Râmnicu Sărat
 Tehnometal București
 Minerul Cavnic

Promoted to Divizia A
 Petrolul Ploiești
 CS Târgoviște
 Olimpia Satu Mare

Renamed teams
SC Tulcea was renamed as Delta Tulcea.

League tables

Serie I

Serie II

Serie III

See also 
 1977–78 Divizia A
 1977–78 Divizia C
 1977–78 County Championship

References

Liga II seasons
Romania
2